This is a list of school districts in Iowa, sorted by Area Education Agencies (AEA).
Districts are listed by their official names, though several schools use "Schools" in their name or website rather than "Community School District".
, this list has not been expanded to include former school districts.

Background
In the early 1900s the state had 4,873 school districts. The state government passed the Consolidated School of Law of 1906 and this figure fell to 4,863 in 1908, 4,839 in 1922,. and 4,558 in 1953. That year some additional laws were passed that contributed to reducing this further, and so this fell further to 458 as of July 1, 1965; that year another law made providing a high school mandatory for a school district, which meant school districts that had one room schoolhouses were required to consolidate.

By July 1, 1980, the number of districts was down to 443. In 1984, there were 437 school districts in the state that operated high schools. In 1990 the total number of school districts was 430. In fall 1995 the number of school districts operating high schools was down to 353, and in 1995 670 was the median enrollment K-12 of an Iowa school district. An Iowa Department of Education consultant named Guy Ghan referred to the 1990s school district mergers as the "third wave".

The total number of school districts was 365 on July 1, 2005. In the 2016–2017 school year there were 333 school districts, an 11% decrease from the same figure in 2000.

Circa the 1980s school districts began agreements to share resources, such as particular employees, or "whole grade sharing" (where students of one or more grade levels are sent to a different school district to get their education). In 2005 Tom Vilsack, the Governor of Iowa, proposed that requirements for school districts to have certain numbers of students or sharing employees as ways of reducing local government spending, though Vilsack never enacted those requirements. In 2007 Josh Nelson of The Waterloo-Cedar Falls Courier wrote that "Lately, consolidation hasn't been as big of an issue compared to previous years."

By 2016 population losses in rural areas have fueled further school district consolidations. By 2017 there had been school districts that had formed from different generations of school consolidations.

Central Rivers AEA

Black Hawk County

 Cedar Falls Community School District 
 Dunkerton Community School District (also extends into Bremer County)
 Hudson Community School District 
 Union Community School District 
 Waterloo Community School District

Bremer County

 Denver Community School District (also extends into Black Hawk County)
 Janesville Consolidated Community School District (also extends into Black Hawk County)
 Sumner-Fredericksburg Community School District (also extends into Chickasaw and Fayette Counties)
 Tripoli Community School District (also extends into Chickasaw Counties)
 Wapsie Valley Community School District (also extends into Buchanan County)
 Waverly-Shell Rock Community School District (also extends into Black Hawk and Butler Counties)

Buchanan County

 East Buchanan Community School District
 Independence Community School District (Iowa) (also extends into Benton County)
 Jesup Community School District (also extends into Black Hawk County)

Butler County

 Aplington–Parkersburg Community School District (also extends into Grundy County)
 Clarksville Community School District
 North Butler Community School District (also extends into Floyd County)

Cerro Gordo County

 Clear Lake Community School District
 Mason City Community School District 
 West Fork Community School District (also extends into Franklin County)

Chickasaw County
 Nashua-Plainfield Community School District (also extends into Bremer, Butler and Floyd Counties)

Floyd County

 Charles City Community School District 
 Rudd-Rockford-Marble Rock Community School District

Franklin County

 CAL Community School District
 Hampton–Dumont Community School District

Grundy County

 BCLUW Community School District
 Dike–New Hartford Community School District (also extends into Butler County)
 Gladbrook–Reinbeck Community School District (also extends into Tama County)
 Grundy Center Community School District

Hancock County

 Garner–Hayfield–Ventura Community School District (also extends into Cerro Gordo County)
 West Hancock Community School District (also extends into Wright County)

Hardin County

 AGWSR Community School District (also extends into Franklin County)
 Alden Community School District (also extends into Franklin County)
 Eldora–New Providence Community School District 
 Hubbard–Radcliffe Community School District
 Iowa Falls Community School District (also extends into Franklin County)

Marshall County

 East Marshall Community School District
 Marshalltown Community School District 
 West Marshall Community School District (also extends into Story County)

Mitchell County

 Osage Community School District
 St. Ansgar Community School District

Powesheik County

 Brooklyn-Guernsey-Malcom Community School District 
 Grinnell–Newburg Community School District (also extends into Jasper County)
 Montezuma Community School District

Tama County

 GMG Community School District
 North Tama County Community School District
 South Tama County Community School District

Winnebago County

 Forest City Community School District (also extends into Hancock County)
 Lake Mills Community School District
 North Iowa Community School District

Worth County

 Central Springs Community School District (also extends into Cerro Gordo, Floyd and Mitchell Counties)
 Northwood-Kensett Community School District

Wright County
 Belmond–Klemme Community School District (also extends into Hancock County)

Grant Wood AEA

Benton County

 Belle Plaine Community School District (also extends into Iowa, Powesheik and Tama Counties)
 Benton Community School District 
 Vinton-Shellsburg Community School District

Cedar County
 North Cedar Community School District (of Stanwood) (also extends into Jones County)
 Tipton Community School District 
 West Branch Community School District (also extends into Johnson County)

Iowa County

 English Valleys Community School District (also extends into Keokuk and Poweshiek Counties)
 H-L-V Community School District (also extends into Poweshiek County)
 Iowa Valley Community School District
 Williamsburg Community School District

Johnson County

 Clear Creek–Amana Community School District (also extends into Iowa County)
 Iowa City Community School District 
 Lone Tree Community School District 
 Solon Community School District (also extends into Linn County)

Jones County

 Anamosa Community School District 
 Midland Community School District
 Monticello Community School District
 Olin Consolidated Community School District

Linn County

 Alburnett Community School District 
 Cedar Rapids Community School District 
 Center Point-Urbana Community School District
 Central City Community School District
 College Community School District (of Cedar Rapids) (also extends into Benton and Johnson Counties)
 Linn-Mar Community School District (of Marion) 
 Lisbon Community School District 
 Marion Independent School District 
 Mount Vernon Community School District (also extends into Johnson and Jones Counties)
 North Linn Community School District (of Troy Mills) 
 Springville Community School District

Washington County

 Highland Community School District (also extends into Johnson County)
 Mid-Prairie Community School District (also extends into Iowa and Johnson Counties)
 Washington Community School District (also extends into Jefferson Counties)

Great Prairie AEA

Appanoose County

 Centerville Community School District 
 Moravia Community School District (also extends into Monroe County)
 Moulton-Udell Community School District

Davis County
 Davis County Community School District

Des Moines County

 Burlington Community School District
 Danville Community School District (also extends into Henry County)
 Mediapolis Community School District (also extends into Louisa County)
 West Burlington Independent School District

Henry County

 Mount Pleasant Community School District (also extends into Jefferson, Lee and Van Buren Counties)
 New London Community School District (also extends into Des Moines County)
 WACO Community School District (also extends into Louisa and Washington Counties)
 Winfield-Mt. Union Community School District (also extends into Des Moines, Louisa and Washington Counties)

Jefferson County

 Fairfield Community School District (also extends into Henry, Van Buren, Wappello and Washington Counties)
 Pekin Community School District

Keokuk County

 Keota Community School District (also extends into Washington Counties)
 Sigourney Community School District 
 Tri-County Community School District (also extends into Mahaska and Poweshiek Counties)

Lee County

 Central Lee Community School District
 Fort Madison Community School District (also extends into Henry County)
 Keokuk Community School District

Louisa County

 Morning Sun Community School District (also extends into Des Moines County)
 Wapello Community School District (also extends into Des Moines County)

Lucas County
 Chariton Community School District

Mahaska County

 North Mahaska Community School District (also extends into Poweshiek County)
 Oskaloosa Community School District

Monroe County
 Albia Community School District

Van Buren County
 Van Buren County Community School District

Wapello County

 Cardinal Community School District (also extends into Davis, Jefferson and Van Buren Counties)
 Eddyville–Blakesburg–Fremont Community School District (also extends into Mahaska and Monroe Counties)
 Ottumwa Community School District

Wayne County

 Seymour Community School District
 Wayne Community School District

Green Hills AEA

Adair County

 Nodaway Valley Community School District 
 Orient-Macksburg Community School District (also extends into Madison County)

Adams County
 Corning Community School District

Carroll County
 IKM–Manning Community School District (also extends into Crawford and Shelby Counties)

Cass County

 Atlantic Community School District (also extends into Audubon and Pottawattamie Counties)
 CAM Community School District (also extends into Adair, Adams and Audubon Counties)
 Griswold Community School District (also extends into Montgomery and Pottawattamie Counties)

Clarke County

 Clarke Community School District 
 Murray Community School District

Decatur County

 Central Decatur Community School District
 Lamoni Community School District

Fremont County

 Fremont–Mills Community School District (also extends into Mills County)
 Hamburg Community School District
 Sidney Community School District

Harrison County

 Boyer Valley Community School District (also extends into Crawford County)
 Logan–Magnolia Community School District
 Missouri Valley Community School District (also extends into Pottawattamie County)
 West Harrison Community School District
 Woodbine Community School District (also extends into Monona and Shelby Counties)

Mills County

 East Mills Community School District (also extends into Montgomery County)
 Glenwood Community School District (also extends into Pottawattamie County)

Montgomery County

 Red Oak Community School District (also extends into Page and Pottawattamie Counties)
 Stanton Community School District (also extends into Page County)
 Villisca Community School District (also extends into Adams, Page and Taylor Counties)

Page County

 Clarinda Community School District (also extends into Taylor County)
 Essex Community School District (also extends into Montgomery County)
 Shenandoah Community School District (also extends into Fremont County)
 South Page Community School District

Pottawattamie County

 AHSTW Community School District
 Council Bluffs Community School District 
 Lewis Central Community School District 
 Riverside Community School District
 Treynor Community School District
 Tri-Center Community School District
 Underwood Community School District

Ringgold County

 Diagonal Community School District
 Mount Ayr Community School District

Shelby County
 Harlan Community School District (also extends into Harrison County)

Taylor County

 Bedford Community School District
 Lenox Community School District (also extends into Adams County)

Union County

 Creston Community School District
 East Union Community School District

Wayne County
 Mormon Trail Community School District

Heartland AEA

Audubon County
 Audubon Community School District

Boone County

 Boone Community School District 
 Madrid Community School District 
 Ogden Community School District 
 United Community School District (of Boone) (also extends into Story County)

Carroll County

 Carroll Community School District 
 Coon Rapids–Bayard Community School District (also extends into Guthrie County)
 Glidden–Ralston Community School District (also extends into Greene County)

Dallas County

 Adel–De Soto–Minburn Community School District 
 Perry Community School District 
 Van Meter Community School District 
 Waukee Community School District 
 Woodward-Granger Community School District (also extends into Polk County)

Guthrie County

 Adair–Casey Community School District
 Guthrie Center Community School District
 Panorama Community School District 
 West Central Valley Community School District (also extends into Adair and Dallas Counties)

Jasper County

 Baxter Community School District (also extends into Marshall Counties)
 Colfax–Mingo Community School District 
 Lynnville–Sully Community School District (also extends into Mahaska and Poweshiek Counties)
 Newton Community School District 
 PCM Community School District (also extends into Marion and Polk Counties)

Madison County

 Earlham Community School District
 Interstate 35 Community School District 
 Winterset Community School District

Marion County

 Knoxville Community School District
 Melcher-Dallas Community School District 
 Pella Community School District (also extends into Mahaska County)
 Pleasantville Community School District 
 Twin Cedars Community School District

Polk County

 Ankeny Community School District 
 Bondurant–Farrar Community School District 
 Des Moines Independent Community School District (also extends into Warren County)
 Dallas Center-Grimes Community School District (also extends into Dallas County)
 Johnston Community School District
 North Polk Community School District 
 Saydel Community School District 
 Southeast Polk Community School District 
 Urbandale Community School District (also extends into Dallas County)
 West Des Moines Community School District (also extends into Dallas and Warren Counties)

Shelby County
 Exira–Elk Horn–Kimballton Community School District (also extends into Audubon County)
 Harlan Community School District

Story County

 Ames Community School District 
 Ballard Community School District (also extends into Boone and Polk Counties)
 Collins–Maxwell Community School District 
 Colo–NESCO Community School District 
 Gilbert Community School District 
 Nevada Community School District 
 Roland–Story Community School District

Warren County

 Carlisle Community School District (also extends into Polk County)
 Indianola Community School District 
 Martensdale-St Marys Community School District 
 Norwalk Community School District (also extends into Polk County)
 Southeast Warren Community School District

Keystone AEA

Allamakee County

 Allamakee Community School District 
 Eastern Allamakee Community School District 
 Postville Community School District (also extends into Clayton County)

Chickasaw County
 New Hampton Community School District

Clayton County

 Central Community School District
 Clayton Ridge Community School District
 Edgewood–Colesburg Community School District (also extends into Delaware County)
 MFL MarMac Community School District

Delaware County

 Maquoketa Valley Community School District
 West Delaware County Community School District

Dubuque County

 Dubuque Community School District
 Western Dubuque Community School District

Fayette County

 North Fayette Valley Community School District
 Oelwein Community School District
 Starmont Community School District 
 West Central Community School District

Howard County

 Howard–Winneshiek Community School District (also extends into Winneshiek County)
 Riceville Community School District (also extends into Mitchell County)

Winneshiek County

 Decorah Community School District (also extends into Allamakee County)
 South Winneshiek Community School District 
 Turkey Valley Community School District

Mississippi Bend AEA

Cedar County

 Bennett Community School District (also extends into Louisa and Scott Counties)
 Durant Community School District (also extends into Muscatine and Scott Counties)

Clinton County

 Calamus–Wheatland Community School District
 Camanche Community School District 
 Central DeWitt Community School District
 Clinton Community School District 
 Delwood Community School District (also extends into Jackson County)
 Northeast Community School District

Jackson County

 Andrew Community School District 
 Bellevue Community School District
 Easton Valley School District (also extends into Clinton County)
 Maquoketa Community School District (also extends into Clinton and Dubuque Counties)

Louisa County
 Columbus Community School District (also extends into Muscatine County)
 Louisa–Muscatine Community School District (also extends into Muscatine County)

Muscatine County

 Muscatine Community School District
 West Liberty Community School District 
 Wilton Community School District (also extends into Cedar County)

Scott County

 Bettendorf Community School District 
 Davenport Community School District 
 North Scott Community School District (of Eldridge) 
 Pleasant Valley Community School District

Northwest AEA

Cherokee County

 Cherokee Community School District
 Marcus-Meriden-Cleghorn Community School District

Crawford County

 Ar-We-Va Community School District (also extends into Carroll County)
 Charter Oak–Ute Community School District (also extends into Monona County)
 Denison Community School District (also extends into Ida County)
 Schleswig Community School District (also extends into Ida County)

Ida County

 Galva–Holstein Community School District
 Odebolt–Arthur–Battle Creek–Ida Grove Community School District (also extends into Sac County)

Lyon County

 Central Lyon Community School District
 George–Little Rock Community School District (also extends into Osceola and Sioux Counties)
 West Lyon Community School District (also extends into Sioux County)

Monona County

 Maple Valley-Anthon Oto Community School District (also extends into Woodbury County)
 West Monona Community School District (also extends into Harrison County)
 Whiting Community School District

O'Brien County

 Hartley–Melvin–Sanborn Community School District (also extends into Dickinson and Osceola Counties)
 Sheldon Community School District (also extends into Sioux County)
 South O'Brien Community School District

Osceola County
 Sibley-Ocheyedan Community School District

Plymouth County

 Akron–Westfield Community School District
 Hinton Community School District
 Kingsley–Pierson Community School District
 Le Mars Community School District
 Remsen-Union Community School District (also extends into Sioux County)

Sioux County

 Boyden-Hull Community School District 
 MOC-Floyd Valley Community School District 
 Rock Valley Community School District (also extends into Lyon County)
 Sioux Center Community School District 
 West Sioux Community School District

Woodbury County

 Lawton–Bronson Community School District
 River Valley Community School District (also extends into Cherokee and Ida Counties)
 Sergeant Bluff-Luton Community School District 
 Sioux City Community School District (also extends into Plymouth County)
 Westwood School District (also extends into Monona County)
 Woodbury Central Community School District

Prairie Lakes AEA

Buena Vista County

 Albert City–Truesdale Community School District (also extends into Pocahontas County)
 Alta–Aurelia Community School District (also extends into Cherokee County)
 Newell-Fonda Community School District (also extends into Pocahontas County)
 Sioux Central Community School District
 Storm Lake Community School District (also extends into Sac County)

Calhoun County
 Manson–Northwest Webster Community School District (also extends into Webster County)
 South Central Calhoun Community School District

Clay County
 Clay Central–Everly Community School District (also extends into Dickinson and O'Brien Counties)
 Spencer Community School District

Dickinson County

 Harris–Lake Park Community School District (also extends into Osceola County)
 Okoboji Community School District
 Spirit Lake Community School District

Emmet County
 Estherville–Lincoln Central Community School District (also extends into Tama County)
 North Union Community School District (also extends into Kossuth and Palo Alto Counties)

Greene County

 Greene County Community School District
 Paton-Churdan Community School District

Hamilton County

 South Hamilton Community School District 
 Stratford Community School District (also extends into Boone and Webster Counties)
 Webster City Community School District

Humboldt County

 Gilmore City–Bradgate Community School District (also extends into Pocahontas County)
 Humboldt Community School District (also extends into Webster and Wright Counties)
 Twin Rivers Community School District

Kossuth County

 Algona Community School District
 LuVerne Community School District (also extends into Humboldt County)
 North Kossuth Community School District

Palo Alto County

 Emmetsburg Community School District
 Graettinger–Terril Community School District (also extends into Clay, Dickinson and Emmet Counties)
 Ruthven-Ayrshire Community School District (also extends into Clay County)
 West Bend–Mallard Community School District (also extends into Kossuth County)

Pocahontas County

 Laurens–Marathon Community School District (also extends into Buena Vista, Clay and Palo Alto Counties)
 Pocahontas Area Community School District

Sac County

 East Sac County Community School District (also extends into Carroll and Crawford Counties)
 Schaller-Crestland Community School District

Webster County

 Fort Dodge Community School District 
 Prairie Valley Community School District
 Southeast Webster-Grand Community School District

Wright County

 Clarion–Goldfield–Dows Community School District (also extends into Franklin, Hancock and Humboldt Counties)
 Eagle Grove Community School District

See also
List of high schools in Iowa
List of private schools in Iowa
Wikipedia:WikiProject Missing encyclopedic articles/High schools/US/Iowa

References

Reference notes

Further reading
 - On the servers of the University of Iowa
 - Letter to the editor
 - Includes reports from the 1990s on school consolidation

External links
 Iowa Department of Education
  - Des Moines Register article series about rural school district consolidations and closures of schools

School districts
Iowa
School districts